"Michelle" is a song by the English rock band the Beatles from their 1965 album Rubber Soul. It was composed principally by Paul McCartney, with the middle eight co-written with John Lennon. The song is a love ballad with part of its lyrics sung in French.

Following its inclusion on Rubber Soul, the song was released as a single in some European countries and in New Zealand, and on an EP in France, in early 1966. It was a number 1 hit for the Beatles in Belgium, France, Norway, the Netherlands and New Zealand. Concurrent recordings of the song by David and Jonathan and the Overlanders were similarly successful in North America and Britain, respectively. "Michelle" won the Grammy Award for Song of the Year in 1967 and has since become one of the most widely recorded of all Beatles songs.

Composition
The instrumental music of "Michelle" originated separately from the lyrical concept. According to McCartney:
"Michelle" was a tune that I'd written in Chet Atkins' finger-picking style. There is a song he did called "Trambone" with a repetitive top line, and he played a bass line while playing a melody.  This was an innovation for us; even though classical guitarists had played it, no rock 'n' roll guitarists had played it. The first person we knew to use finger-picking style was Chet Atkins ... I never learned it. But based on Atkins' "Trambone", I wanted to write something with a melody and a bass line in it, so I did. I just had it as an instrumental in C.

The words and style of "Michelle" have their origins in the popularity of Parisian Left Bank culture during McCartney's Liverpool days. In his description, "it was at the time of people like Juliette Greco, the French bohemian thing." McCartney had gone to a party of art students where a student with a goatee and a striped T-shirt was singing a French song. He soon wrote a farcical imitation to entertain his friends that involved French-sounding groaning instead of real words. The song remained a party piece until 1965, when John Lennon suggested he rework it into a proper song for inclusion on Rubber Soul.

McCartney asked Jan Vaughan, a French teacher and the wife of his old friend Ivan Vaughan, to come up with a French name and a phrase that rhymed with it. McCartney said: "It was because I'd always thought that the song sounded French that I stuck with it. I can't speak French properly so that's why I needed help in sorting out the actual words."

Vaughan came up with "Michelle, ma belle", and a few days later McCartney asked for a translation of "these are words that go together well", rendered, for scansion, as sont des mots qui vont très bien ensemble ("are words that go very well together"). When McCartney played the song for Lennon, Lennon suggested the "I love you" bridge. Lennon was inspired by a song he heard the previous evening, Nina Simone's version of "I Put a Spell on You", which used the same phrase but with the emphasis on the last word, "I love you".

Each version of this song has a different length. The UK mono mix is 2:33 whereas the stereo version extends to 2:40 and the US mono is 2:43. The version available in The Beatles: Rock Band has a running time of 2:50.

Musical structure 

The song was initially composed in C, but was played in F on Rubber Soul (with a capo on the fifth fret). The verse opens with an F major chord ("Michelle" – melody note C) then the second chord (on "ma belle" – melody note D) is a B79 (on the original demo in C, the second chord is a F79). McCartney called this second chord a "great ham-fisted jazz chord" that was taught to them by Jim Gretty who worked at Hessey's music shop in Whitechapel, central Liverpool and which George Harrison uses (as a G79) (see Dominant seventh sharp ninth chord) as the penultimate chord of his solo on "Till There Was You". After the E6 (of "these are words") there follows an ascent involving different inversions of the D dim chord. These progress from Adim on "go" – melody note F, bass note D; to Bdim (Cdim) on "to" – melody note A, bass note D; to Ddim on "ge ..." – melody note B (C) bass note B; to Bdim on ... 'ther ..." – melody note A bass note B, till the dominant (V) chord (C major) is reached on "well" – melody note G bass note C.

George Martin, the Beatles' producer, recalled that he composed the melody of the guitar solo, which is heard midway through the song and again during the fadeout. He showed Harrison the notes during the recording session and then accompanied the guitarist (on piano, out of microphone range) when the solos were overdubbed. In terms of its complementary role to the main melody, musicologist Walter Everett likens this guitar part to two musical passages that Martin had arranged for singer Cilla Black the previous year: a bassoon–English horn combination on "Anyone Who Had a Heart" and the baritone electric guitar on "You're My World".

Release
EMI's Parlophone label released Rubber Soul on 3 December 1965 in Britain, with "Michelle" sequenced as the final track on side one of the LP. The album was widely viewed as marking a significant progression within the Beatles' work and in the scope of pop music generally. Recalling the album's release for Mojo magazine in 2002, Richard Williams said "Michelle" represented "the biggest shock of all" to a contemporary pop audience, as McCartney conveyed "all his nostalgia for a safe childhood in the 1950s, itself a decade suffused with nostalgia for the inter-war security of the '20s and '30s, the era to which this song specifically refers."

Although no single from Rubber Soul was issued in Britain or America, "Michelle" was the most popular Rubber Soul track on US radio. The song was released as a commercial single in several other countries. It topped charts in Italy (for eight weeks), the Netherlands (seven weeks), Sweden (five weeks), Denmark (four weeks) and Hong Kong, Ireland, New Zealand and Singapore. In May 1966, Billboards Hits of the World listed the song at number 1 in Argentina and Norway, among other countries. It was also number 1 in France (for five weeks) as the lead track on an EP release, since France continued to favour the extended-play format over singles.

At the 1967 Ivor Novello Awards, "Michelle" won in the category of "the Most Performed Work" of 1966, ahead of "Yesterday". "Michelle" won the Grammy Award for Song of the Year in 1967, against competition from "Born Free", "The Impossible Dream", "Somewhere My Love" and "Strangers in the Night". In 1999, BMI named "Michelle" as the 42nd most performed song of the 20th century.

Critical reception
In a contemporary review for the NME, Allen Evans described "Michelle" as a "memorable track" with a "bluesy French sound" in which McCartney's vocal was supported by "[the] others using voices as instruments". Record Mirrors reviewer admired the lyrics and said that the song was "just remotely, faintly, slightly similar to 'Yesterday' in the general approach" and "another stand-out performance". Eden of KRLA Beat described "Michelle" as a "beautiful ballad", adding: "Although it doesn't sound at all like his fantastic 'Yesterday', it is another tender love song, sung as only Paul could sing it. He even croons the choruses in Frenchand what better language for a love song?" Jazz critic and broadcaster Steve Race admitted to being "astonished" by the album, and added: "When I heard 'Michelle' I couldn't believe my ears. The second chord is an A-chord, while the note in the melody above is A-flat. This is an unforgivable clash, something no one brought up knowing older music could ever have done. It is entirely unique, a stroke of genius... I suppose it was sheer musical ignorance that allowed John and Paul to do it, but it took incredible daring."

Among the Beatles' peers, Bob Dylan, whose work was especially influential on Lennon and Harrison's songwriting on Rubber Soul, was dismissive of McCartney's ballad style. In March 1966, he said: "A song like 'Yesterday' or 'Michelle'... it's such a cop-out, man... if you go to the Library of Congress you can find a lot better than that. There are millions of songs like 'Yesterday' and 'Michelle' written in Tin Pan Alley." Levi Stubbs of the Four Tops, an American vocal group promoted in the UK by Beatles manager Brian Epstein, cited the song as an example of the sophistication the Beatles had introduced into pop music. He said that the US music scene had been "very dead-beat" and "stagnant" before the arrival of the British Invasion, after which, "Good music became accepted. Would 'Michelle' have been a hit before the Beatles? Of course not."

From 1970, McCartney's standing among music critics suffered as the authentic rock 'n' roll qualities personified by Lennon came to be valued over his former bandmate's more eclectic tastes. In his 1979 essay on the Beatles in The Rolling Stone Illustrated History of Rock & Roll, Greil Marcus said that Rubber Soul was the best of all the band's LPs and that "every cut was an inspiration, something new and remarkable in and of itself" except "Michelle", although he added, "to be fair, [it] paid the bills for years to come".

Cover versions
"Michelle" was the most successful track from Rubber Soul for other recording artists and attracted dozens of cover versions within a year of its release. Author Peter Doggett lists it with "Yesterday" and several other Beatles compositions, mostly written by McCartney, that provided contemporary relevance for "light orchestras and crooners" in the easy listening category, persuaded adults that the new generation's musical tastes had merit and, by becoming some of the most widely recorded songs of all time, "ensured that Lennon and McCartney would become the highest-earning composers in history".

The song was a UK hit in January 1966 for the Overlanders, whose version topped the Record Retailer chart. It also reached number 2 in Australia. Signed to Pye Records, the Overlanders issued their recording after the Beatles had declined to release it as a single themselves in the United Kingdom and the United States. Pye and the Overlanders were given the Beatles' blessing because the record label had recently acquiesced to Epstein's request that they withdraw a single by Lennon's estranged father, Alf Lennon.

"Michelle" was also covered by David and Jonathan, whose version was produced by Martin. This recording went to number 1 in Canada and number 18 in the US, and was also a top 20 hit in Britain. Author Jon Savage writes that both the Overlanders' and David and Jonathan's versions were "mainstream pop songs, accentuating the very Beatles balladry that put off many hardcore fans"; he says this added to a perception that the Beatles had become "part of the Establishment" after receiving their MBEs from Queen Elizabeth II in October 1965.

American singer Billy Vaughn was another artist who recorded the song soon after its release. In his comments on the Lennon–McCartney composition, Steve Race remarked that Vaughn's arranger had altered the second chord to incorporate an A note, thereby "taking all the sting out" of the unorthodox change. Race said this was indicative of how a formally trained arranger "was so attuned to the conventional way of thinking he didn't even hear what the boys had done".

Andy Williams covered the song on his 1966 album The Shadow of Your Smile. That same year, "Michelle" was one of Louis Andriessen's "Satirical Arrangements" of Beatles songs for singer Cathy Berberian. American jazz singer Sarah Vaughan also covered the song, while Matt Monro recorded it in 1973 with a string quartet. Instrumental versions were released by the Ventures, using a clavinet over the solo; Booker T. & the M.G.'s; and French bandleader Paul Mauriat, whose interpretation author John Kruth describes as "the most elegant Muzak version" of the song.

Italian singer Mango released an a cappella rendition of "Michelle" on his 2002 album Disincanto. The band Rubblebucket covered the song in 2010, a trip hop version that was included on their Triangular Daisies EP. Beatallica did a cover of the song incorporating the music from "For Whom the Bell Tolls" by Metallica. Titled "For Whom Michelle Tolls", the track appeared on their 2013 album Abbey Load.

The song "Champagne Poetry" from Drake's album Certified Lover Boy samples the lyrics of "Michelle" with "I love you I love you until I find the only words I know that you" in the backing track.

McCartney live performances

"Michelle" was performed by McCartney throughout his 1993 world tour. He has rarely performed the song since, but did include it in a 2009 performance in Washington, DC, in honour of Michelle Obama, the American First Lady, and he would play it on most (if not all) of his performances in France or other francophone countries.

On 2 June 2010, after being awarded the Gershwin Prize for Popular Song by President Barack Obama in a ceremony at the White House, McCartney performed the song for Michelle Obama, who sang along from her seat. McCartney quipped, "I could be the first guy ever to be punched out by a president." Michelle Obama reportedly later told others that she could never have imagined, growing up an African-American girl on the South Side of Chicago, that someday a Beatle would sing "Michelle" to her as First Lady of the United States.

Personnel 
According to Walter Everett:

Paul McCartney – lead vocal, backing vocal, acoustic guitar, bass guitar
John Lennon – backing vocal, classical guitar
George Harrison – backing vocal, acoustic guitar, lead guitar
Ringo Starr – drums

Chart performance

Weekly charts

Year-end charts

The Beatles

Billy Vaughn

Bud Shank

Spokesmen

David & Jonathan

Overlanders

Certifications and sales

Notes

References

Sources

External links
Handwritten lyrics of Michelle in The Beatles Loan at the British Library

CoverTogether: Michelle
 

1960s ballads
1965 songs
1966 singles
Songs written by Lennon–McCartney
The Beatles songs
Chet Atkins songs
Jan and Dean songs
Andy Williams songs
Song recordings produced by George Martin
Songs published by Northern Songs
Number-one singles in Belgium
Number-one singles in France
Dutch Top 40 number-one singles
Number-one singles in New Zealand
Number-one singles in Norway
Number-one singles in Sweden
UK Singles Chart number-one singles
RPM Top Singles number-one singles
Grammy Award for Song of the Year
Pop ballads
Franglais songs